Rene Rooze (born 26 January 1969) is a Dutch former kickboxer and mixed martial artist.

Biography and career
As a member of Team Aerts, he was an active fighter competing in mainly European events and accumulating (as of 2004) a kickboxing record of 32-7-1 with 4 KOs. Also was a holder of the European super heavyweight kickboxing title (MTBN) 

After Peter Aerts split with his previous kickboxing club Chakuriki and the creation of his own Team Aerts, Rene Rooze took up the position of his cornerman. Since his retirement he has gone on to be a successful Muay Thai instructor and conditioning coach.

Rooze also competed in a number of mixed martial arts bouts and held a record of 5 wins and 4 losses. Notably, he fought the Japanese sumo wrestler Tadao Yasuda twice and knocked him out on both occasions. He lost his last MMA bout at Bushido Europe: Rotterdam Rumble against Alexander Emelianenko on October 9, 2005.
He is also famous for his many fouls and misconducts.

Kickboxing record

Mixed martial arts record

|-
| Loss
|align=center| 5–4
| Alexander Emelianenko
| KO (punches)
| Bushido Europe: Rotterdam Rumble
| 
|align=center| 1
|align=center| 0:28
| Rotterdam, Netherlands
| 
|-
| Loss
|align=center| 5–3
| Josh Barnett
| TKO (punches)
| K-1 MMA ROMANEX
| 
|align=center| 1
|align=center| 2:15
| Saitama, Japan
| 
|-
| Win
|align=center| 5–2
| Tadao Yasuda
| TKO (punches)
| Inoki Bom-Ba-Ye 2003
| 
|align=center| 1
|align=center| 0:50
| Kobe, Japan
| 
|-
| Win
|align=center| 4–2
| Ivan Salaverry
| TKO (dislocated finger)
| K-1 Survival 2003 Japan Grand Prix Final
| 
|align=center| 1
|align=center| 2:42
| Yokohama, Japan
| 
|-
| Win
|align=center| 3–2
| Tadao Yasuda
| KO (kick)
| K-1 Andy Memorial 2001 Japan GP Final
| 
|align=center| 3
|align=center| 0:09
| Saitama, Japan
| 
|-
| Loss
|align=center| 2–2
| Heath Herring
| DQ (excessive fouling)
| 2H2H 1: 2 Hot 2 Handle
| 
|align=center| 1
|align=center| 3:20
| Rotterdam, Netherlands
| 
|-
| Win
|align=center| 2–1
| Satoshi Honma
| TKO (referee stoppage)
| K-1 Hercules
| 
|align=center| 1
|align=center| 2:48
| Japan
| 
|-
| Loss
|align=center| 1–1
| Enson Inoue
| Submission (rear naked choke)
| VTJ 1995: Vale Tudo Japan 1995
| 
|align=center| 1
|align=center| 6:41
| Tokyo, Japan
| 
|-
| Win
|align=center| 1–0
| Andre Van Den Oetelaar
| TKO (towel thrown from strikes)
| CFT 1: Cage Fight Tournament 1
| 
|align=center| 1
|align=center| 2:27
| Belgium
|

References

External links

 http://www.k-1.co.jp/k-1gp/fighter/rene_rooze.htm

Dutch male kickboxers
Heavyweight kickboxers
Dutch male mixed martial artists
Heavyweight mixed martial artists
Mixed martial artists utilizing Muay Thai
Dutch Muay Thai practitioners
1969 births
Living people